"Quiet" is a feminist anthem co-written, co-produced, and performed by Los Angeles–based singer-songwriter MILCK. It received national attention after she organized a capella performances of the song at the 2017 Women's March in Washington D.C., after which she made the sheet music publicly available and organized further activity around the song.

History
MILCK wrote "Quiet" with her co-writer Adrianne “AG” Gonzalez in 2015. While the song draws on the artist’s adolescent experiences of domestic violence, depression, and anorexia, it was inspired by “a nightmare in which she was being assaulted and a bystander in her dream told her she just had to stay quiet until it was over.” The lyrical structure of the song breaks with the most common pop music song structure, taking the form of verse, pre-chorus, chorus, pre-chorus, chorus, bridge, chorus.

MILCK organized 26 singers from various choirs around the U.S. into the #ICANTKEEPQUIET chorus, to perform an a cappella version of her song flash mob style during the 2017 Women’s March in Washington, D.C. One performance with the singers from the GW Sirens & Capital Blend went viral on the internet; MILCK was praised for having authored the “unofficial anthem” of the Women’s March. Within a week, MILCK and other performers reprised the Women's March version on the television show Full Frontal with Samantha Bee.

In response to the attention given to "Quiet" as a result of the Women's March, MILCK publicized the song on Twitter using the hashtag #ICANTKEEPQUIET. This was intended to allow people to share their stories and access the sheet music for the a cappella version for free, so that they could create their own #ICANTKEEPQUIET choirs.

Personnel
MILCK – composer, lead vocals
Adrianne Gonzalez – composer, background vocals
Rod Castro – guitar
Matt Chamberlain – drums
Patricia Bahia - background vocals
Kyler England - background vocals
Keely Bumford - background vocals
Dia Frampton - background vocals
Mary Osborne - background vocals
Iljeoma Njaka - background vocals
Sophia Dion - background vocals
Hungarian Studio Orchestra - orchestra

References

2017 songs
Women's rights in the United States
Songs about sexual assault